Belloa nivea is a plant native to central Chile.

References 

Gnaphalieae
Flora of South America